Events in the year 1941 in Portugal.

Incumbents
President: Óscar Carmona
Prime Minister: António de Oliveira Salazar

Events

Arts and entertainment

Films
19 September – release of O Pai Tirano, film comedy directed by António Lopes Ribeiro.

Sports
S.C. Praiense founded
SC Alba founded

Births

21 April – Eduardo Guedes, film-maker (d. 2000)
21 July – Diogo de Freitas do Amaral, politician and law professor

Deaths

References

 
1940s in Portugal
Portugal
Years of the 20th century in Portugal
Portugal